Mo Henry is an American film negative cutter whose works include Jaws, Apocalypse Now Redux, L.A. Confidential, and The Big Lebowski.

Career 
As a fourth generation negative cutter, Henry's distant aunt emigrated from Ireland during the 1920s where she first worked at Deluxe Laboratories, which was later acquired by 20th Century Fox. She passed on her knowledge of the trade to her children, which included Henry's father. Mike Henry, who had served as Metro-Goldwyn-Mayer's chief negative cutter, would in turn teach his daughter. After Mo had graduated from high school, Henry's father had heard that Universal Studios was looking for union negative cutters as none were available. He recommended her daughter for the job, and the first feature film she worked on was Steven Spielberg's blockbuster Jaws in 1975. She later worked at several television studios including Quinn Martin Productions on a number of episodic television shows throughout the 1970s, including The Waltons, Eight Is Enough, Cagney & Lacey and M*A*S*H.

By the 1980s, having always wanting to be an interior designer, Henry decided to become a real estate agent in Beverly Hills, California. "I loved houses and designs and thought real estate would put me in all these great houses," Henry stated. Soon, she returned to Hollywood, only this time serving as a production assistant for a commercial production company. Eventually, her cousin invited her back to resume working at Universal Studios's negative cutting department. Before long, she was contacted by fellow negative cutter Donah Bassett, in which she joined her firm D. Bassett & Associates. In 1992, she formed her own company, and from there began working more closely with filmmakers, getting more involved in the movies she was cutting.

In 2018, she was interviewed about her work on Orson Welles's final film, The Other Side of the Wind, in the documentary short A Final Cut for Orson.

References

External links
 
 Mo Henry tribute page
 Mo Henry Fan Club

American film editors
American women film editors
Living people
Year of birth missing (living people)
21st-century American women